Kevin A. Huyck is a retired United States Air Force major general who last served as the director for operations of the United States Northern Command. He previously held the same position for the Air Combat Command.

References

External links
 

Living people
Major generals
Place of birth missing (living people)
Recipients of the Air Force Distinguished Service Medal
Recipients of the Defense Superior Service Medal
Recipients of the Legion of Merit
United States Air Force generals
United States Air Force personnel of the War in Afghanistan (2001–2021)
Year of birth missing (living people)